Trevor David (born 28 January 1997) is a Dutch professional footballer who plays as a right-back for TOP Oss.

Club career

ADO Den Haag
David made his professional debut in the Eredivisie for ADO Den Haag on 14 January 2017 in a game against SC Heerenveen. 

In July 2018, he tore his cruciate ligament which sidelined him for an extended period of time.

TOP Oss
After being a free agent for a year, David signed a two-year contract with TOP Oss on 13 August 2020. He made his debut for the club on 29 August as a starter in a 1–2 home loss to Helmond Sport. David quickly established himself as a starter at right-back for the club, making 30 appearances in his first season, as TOP Oss finished 10th in the league table.

In late October 2021, David announced his retirement from professional football citing a desire to "find a new path in life".

David came out of retirement on 11 July 2022, and signed with TOP Oss again.

Career statistics

References

External links
 

1997 births
Living people
Sportspeople from Voorburg
Association football defenders
Dutch footballers
ADO Den Haag players
TOP Oss players
Eredivisie players
Eerste Divisie players
Footballers from South Holland